Monte Cristo or Montecristo may refer to:

Places
 Montecristo, an Italian island in the Tuscan Archipelago
 Montecristo, Bolívar, Colombia
 Montecristo de Guerrero, a town in Mexico
 Monte Cristo Homestead, a historic property in Junee, New South Wales
 Monte Cristo, a town in Río Primero Department, Argentina

United States
 Monte Cristo, Sierra County, California, a former settlement and gold mine
 Monte Cristo Mountains, a mountain range in Nye County, Nevada
 Monte Cristo Range (Nevada), a mountain range in Nevada
 Monte Cristo Range (Utah), a mountain range in Utah
 Monte Cristo, Washington, a ghost town in Washington State
 Monte Cristo Peak, a mountain peak in Washington State
 Monte Cristo Cottage, Eugene O'Neill's summer home in Connecticut
 Monte Cristo Gold Mine, a mine in Los Angeles County, California

Film and television
 Monte Cristo (1922 film), starring John Gilbert
 Montecristo (Argentine TV series), a 2006 Argentine telenovela loosely based on the Alexandre Dumas novel
 Montecristo (Mexican TV series), a 2006 telenovela
 Miss Monte-Cristo, 2021 South Korean revenge drama
 Montecristo (2023 TV series), a Mexican streaming television miniseries

Ships
 Montecristo, a pirated cargo ship whose crew in 2011 used a message in a bottle to help NATO ships proceed with rescue
 Monte Cristo (barque), the former name of Canadian three masted auxiliary barque Endeavour II  
 Monte Cristo (sternwheeler), a steamboat completed in 1891

Other uses
 Marisela de Montecristo (born 1992), a Salvadoran-American model, actress, television presenter, and beauty pageant titleholder
 Monte Cristo (company), a defunct video game developer
 Monte Cristo sandwich, a grilled or fried sandwich
 Montecristo (cigar), a brand of premium cigar
 Christopher Mykkles, or MonteCristo, League of Legends live commentator

See also
 The Count of Monte Cristo (disambiguation)
 Monte Cristi (disambiguation)